Philipp Sandner (born February 23, 1980) is a German economist and professor in the area of business and IT at the Frankfurt School of Finance & Management.

Life and career 
Sandner was born in Heidelberg. Following his Abitur, he completed civilian service in 1999 and studied business administration specialising in business and also IT at the University of Mannheim and at the Copenhagen Business School from 2000 to 2005. From 2005 to 2009, he worked as a researcher at the Institute for Innovation Research, Technology Management and Entrepreneurship at the Ludwig Maximilian University of Munich with Dietmar Harhoff as advisor. He obtained his doctorate as Dr oec. publ. with his dissertation with topic of “The Valuation of Intangible Assets” with the Ludwig Maximilian University of Munich in 2009. He also completed his Master of Business Research (MBR) at this institution. He attended the Berkeley Center for Law & Technology at the University of California at Berkeley for a research placement in 2008. From 2010 to 2012, he worked as a postdoc and researcher at the Chair for Strategy and Organisation with Isabell Welpe as advisor at the Technical University of Munich.

From 2010 to 2015, Sandner was co-founder and partner of the Munich Innovation Group, a business consulting company in specialised in innovation strategy and technology transfer. He became professor at the Frankfurt School of Finance & Management in 2015. In February 2017, the Blockchain Center was founded at the Frankfurt School of Finance & Management with Sandner being the head of this unit. The Frankfurt School Blockchain Center analyses topics such as the implications of blockchain technology for companies and the economy and aims to provide a knowledge-sharing platform for decision-makers, start-ups, technology and industry experts.

Due to his expertise, Sandner was in 2017 appointed to the FinTech Council of the Federal Ministry of Finance (Germany) and to the working group of the EU Blockchain Observatory of the European Union. Further, the working group “National Risk Analysis”, set up by the Federal Ministry of Finance, has involved Sandner concerning crypto assets such as Bitcoin. In 2022, he joined the Digital Finance Forum (DFF) initiated by the Federal Ministry of Finance (Germany).

The German business magazine Capital lists Sandner in the category “Top 40 under 40”. According to the Frankfurter Allgemeine Zeitung, he is also among Germany’s most influential economists in 2018, 2019, 2020, and 2021.

Research and teaching 
Sandner conducts research particularly in the areas of blockchain technology, Bitcoin, crypto assets, Decentralized Finance (DeFi), distributed ledger technology (DLT), digital programmable euro, stablecoins, and digital securities. He continues to deal with corporate entrepreneurship, digital transformation (such as by fintech start-ups), strategic innovation, financing of start-ups (by means of strategic investors, business angels and venture capital, etc.) and intellectual property rights, for example.

He has received several scholarships and best paper awards. His research work has been published in international journals such as the Journal of Marketing, Administrative Science Quarterly, Research Policy, the Journal of Marketing Research and the Journal of Business Venturing. Topics covered by his teaching including digitisation, entrepreneurship, innovation management and intellectual property rights.

References 

1980 births
Living people
Scientists from Frankfurt
German economists
 Copenhagen Business School alumni 
University of Mannheim alumni
Ludwig Maximilian University of Munich alumni